Belgium participated in the ninth Winter Paralympics in Turin, Italy. 

Belgium entered one athlete in the following sport:

Alpine skiing: 1 female

Medalists

See also
2006 Winter Paralympics
Belgium at the 2006 Winter Olympics

External links
Torino 2006 Paralympic Games
International Paralympic Committee
Belgian Olympic and Interfederal Committee

2006
Nations at the 2006 Winter Paralympics
Winter Paralympics